Two Soldiers and a Serving Woman with a Trumpeter (c. 1650–1655) is an oil-on-canvas painting by the Dutch painter Pieter de Hooch.
It is an example of Dutch Golden Age painting and is now in the collection of the Kunsthaus Zürich.

The painting was documented by Hofstede de Groot in 1908, who wrote: "278. Officers resting in a Stable. Two jovial officers are resting in a stable. A comely woman offers them a jug of wine. At the door stands a trumpeter blowing his trumpet. Through an open door at the back are seen people at play. 
Panel, 30 inches by 26 inches. Sales. H. A. Bauer and others, Amsterdam, September 11, 1820, No. 55 
(61 florins, Meusardt). P. J. de Marneffe, Brussels, May 22, 1830, No. 148."

This scene is very similar to other paintings De Hooch made in this period:

References

External links
Stalinterieur met twee drinkende mannen, een trompetspeler en een dienstmeid, ca. 1650-1655 in the RKD

1650s paintings
Paintings by Pieter de Hooch
Paintings in the collection of the Kunsthaus Zürich
Musical instruments in art
Food and drink paintings